Lebia ornata is a species of ground beetle in the genus Lebia ("colorful foliage ground beetles"), in the family Carabidae ("ground beetles"). It was described by American entomologist Thomas Say in 1823.

It is found in a broad range across eastern North America, from Texas to South Dakota, east Nova Scotia, and south to Florida.

References

Further reading
 Arnett, R.H. Jr., and M. C. Thomas. (eds.). (21 December 2000) American Beetles, Volume I: Archostemata, Myxophaga, Adephaga, Polyphaga: Staphyliniformia. CRC Press LLC, Boca Raton, Florida. 
 Bousquet, Yves, and André Larochelle (1993). "Catalogue of the Geadephaga (Coleoptera: Trachypachidae, Rhysodidae, Carabidae including Cicindelini) of America North of Mexico". Memoirs of the Entomological Society of Canada, no. 167, 397.
 Richard E. White. (1983). Peterson Field Guides: Beetles. Houghton Mifflin Company.
 Ross H. Arnett. (2000). American Insects: A Handbook of the Insects of America North of Mexico. CRC Press.

External links
NCBI Taxonomy Browser, Lebia ornata

Lebia
Beetles described in 1823